Spätverkauf, Spätkauf or "Späti" is a type of convenience shop found generally in East German cities, such as Berlin, Dresden or Leipzig, which is known to operate late at night past the usual shopping hours, often 24 hours per day.

Translating literally to 'late purchase', Spätis mostly sell alcohol and tobacco but may also sell groceries or everyday items. Some shops may also offer internet access, a postal service for retail, and usually feature small benches for clients to sit on while drinking beer. Due to the invention of mobile web, many internet cafés have since extended their range of products to function as a Späti. Most shops are run by migrant families of Turkish, Arabian, Vietnamese and otherwise Asian origin and are a part of the culture of Berlin's local neighbourhoods known as "Kiez". Similar kinds of shops with different regional names are found in the Ruhr area, the Rhineland, Hanover and Hamburg.

The end of Sunday openings in 2016 caused a decline in the total number of Spätis. According to the organization "Berliner Späti e.V.", about 800 Spätis had to close down since then. There are said to have been around 2000 Spätis in 2012.

History 
The Spätverkauf was established in the German Democratic Republic in the second half of the 20th century for workers coming home from late night shifts. They were usually shops of the state-owned retail chains Handelsorganisation and Konsum. While regular shops would close at 6 p.m., Spätkaufs would be open until 7 p.m. or 8 p.m., shops in big cities could sometimes have longer opening hours. Depending on local circumstances they would either close at 18.30h or open earlier than regular shops as a Frühverkauf ("early sale"). The word "Spätkauf" had been used in West Berlin as of the 1980s. After the Fall of the Berlin Wall, the shortened term "Späti" was adopted for other stores extending regular business hours. Now, the term Späti has also come to use in some Southern German cities like Stuttgart or Munich.

In 1995 the "antipreneurial" one-man artist group  presented LESS function IS MORE fun as a post-neoist special waste sale of interpassive design-defuncts in a so-called Spätverkauf installation by Laura Kikauka, located at a glass pavilion next to the Volksbühne Berlin, which she claimed as one of her projects of Maximalism.

Legal status and political debates 

Contrary to the usual practice of Spätkaufs, only flowers, print media, baked goods and dairy products may be sold on Sundays between 7 a.m. and 4 p.m., according to Berlin's Ladenschlussgessetz ('shop closing law'). Tourist offers and beverages may only be offered between 1 and 8 p.m. on Sundays. The sale of alcohol is not allowed on Sundays.
 
In March 2012, a Prenzlauer Berg resident reported 48 stores that violated the shop closing law to the Berlin Ordnungsamt ('Office of Public Order'). This led to several Spätkaufs being fined between €150 and €2500. One in particular, "Kollwitz 66", later drew attention with a counter-campaign by displaying the name and phone number of the person reporting the violations at the shop and also publishing it on Facebook.

In a radio interview, Berlin City Councilor Torsten Kühne stated that the Ordnungsamt must thoroughly investigate every violation of the shop closing law. Berlin's Ordnungsamt lacked the resources to do so, however.

In October 2012, the CDU in Pankow tried to introduce legislation that would have legalized Berlin's Spätkaufs. However, this failed. In June 2015, a petition with the hashtag #RettetdieSpätis ("save the Spätis") was started on the website change.org, which demanded an adjustment of the shop closing law that would have changed the legal status of Spätkaufs to something similar to gas stations and train station stores. Due to violations of the Sunday sales ban, fines of €35,000 have been imposed on Spätkauf operators in the district of Friedrichshain-Kreuzberg in 2015, and fines of €70,000 in the district of Neukölln. Bündnis 90/Die Grünen demanded an exemption for Spätkaufs for a number of hours on Sundays, but this was not supported by the governing parties SPD and CDU. Martin Delius, a Pirate Party member, proposed to convert Spätkaufs into charging stations for pedelecs, which would have given them the same legal status as gas stations.

In 2016, a Spätkauf located in the district of Charlottenburg-Wilmersdorf was banned from opening on Sundays by the responsible district office under the threat of a €1,500 fine. After the owner sued before the Administrative Court of Berlin, the court ruled in May 2019 that Berlin's Spätkaufs must remain closed on Sundays as a matter of principle. In the reasoning, it is said that Spätis mainly offer products of everyday demand and are aimed at the unspecific supply of the close surrounding area. Thus, the shops did not fall under a corresponding exemption in the Berlin Ladenöffnungsgesetz  ('shop opening law') for tourist stores.

Similar shops

"Trinkhalle", "Kiosk" and "Büdchen" 
While some places don't have small shops with long business hours, they exist with different names especially in the Ruhr area, the Rhineland, Hanover and Hamburg. They are called "Trinkhalle" (literally translates to 'drinking hall'), "Kiosk" and "Büdchen" (literally translates to 'small stall'). Initially, it was popular for shops to have windows where customers ordered from outside, but now they are usually small bodega-style shops. Additional to selling goods, they provide a space for social interaction and local party culture. Cologne alone has about 1000 "Büdchen". These establishments are part of the town culture, research objects, destinations of city tours and motives for calendar pictures. Since 2016 the "Düsseldorfer Büdchentag" celebrates the local Kiosk culture in the Renish city of Düsseldorf with a special day in the summer. This Büdchentag attracts tourists and Düsseldorfer alike and has grown to become a regular and well-loved fixture in Düsseldorf.

Outside of Germany 
In the Czech Republic, similar shops are called "večerka" ('evening shops'). In France, these kinds of shops are mostly run by Arabic vendors. In Greece there are comparable shops called "Peripteros". In New York, there used to be around 1500 newsstands, which not only sold newspapers, but also drinks, sweets or tobacco products. By now, their number has fallen to about 300, most of these in Manhattan.

In Madrid, there are shops that sell a limited range of food, snacks and toilet paper and are usually open 24 hours per day. These shops are called "chinos", because they're usually run by Asian immigrants. An examination by the Ministerio de Industria, Turismo y Comercio ("Ministry of Industry, Tourism and Commerce") in 2007 counted 16.000 "chinos" and comparable shops in all of Spain, 26% of which were actually run by Chinese immigrants who had been in Spain for less than 10 years.

English translations and alternative names
In Berlin, "Spätkauf" has a lot of English translations and pseudo-anglicisms, like "Late Night Shop", "Late Shop", "Late Buying", "Late Shopping", "Night Shop", "Nightstore" or "All in One Shop". "Spätshop" or "Internetcafé" are also used sometimes.

See also 
 Convenience store
 Superette
 Grocery store

References

External links

Convenience stores
German youth culture